Petaserpes is a genus of millipedes in the family Polyzoniidae. There are about six described species in Petaserpes.

Species
These six species belong to the genus Petaserpes:
 Petaserpes bikermani (Causey, 1951)
 Petaserpes cryptocephalus (McNeill, 1887)
 Petaserpes lateralis (Shelley, 1976)
 Petaserpes mutabilis (Causey, 1951)
 Petaserpes rosalbus Cope, 1879
 Petaserpes strictus (Shelley, 1976)

References

Further reading

 
 

Polyzoniida
Articles created by Qbugbot